Ellisella, commonly known as sea whip, is a genus of soft coral in the family Ellisellidae.

Ellisella constitutes like bushy shrub gorgonians which dominant color is brown to reddish and polyps are white with eight tentacles.

Branches are more or less long according to the species, however, very few ramifications are observed in the genus.

Species list
The following species are recognized within the genus Ellisella:

 Ellisella acacesia (Grasshoff, 1999)
 Ellisella andamanensis (Simpson, 1910)
 Ellisella atlantica (Toeplitz, 1910)
 Ellisella aurantiaca (Thomson & Henderson)
 Ellisella azilia (Grasshoff, 1999)
 Ellisella candida (Ridley, 1882)
 Ellisella ceratophyta (Linnaeus, 1758)
 Ellisella cercidia (Grasshoff, 1999)
 Ellisella ceylonensis (Simpson, 1910)
 Ellisella cylindrica (Toeplitz, 1919)
 Ellisella divisa (Thomson & Henderson, 1905)
 Ellisella dolfusi (Stiasny, 1938)
 Ellisella elongata (Pallas, 1766)
 Ellisella erythraea (Kükenthal, 1913)
 Ellisella eustala (Grasshoff, 1999)
 Ellisella filiformis (Toeplitz, 1889)
 Ellisella flagellum (Thomson & Russell, 1910)
 Ellisella flava (Nutting, 1910)
 Ellisella funiculina (Duchassaing & Michelotti, 1864)
 Ellisella gracilis (Wright & Studer, 1889)
 Ellisella grandiflora (Deichmann, 1936)
 Ellisella grandis (Verrill, 1901)
 Ellisella gruveli (Stiasny, 1936)
 Ellisella laevis (Verrill, 1865)
 Ellisella limbaughi (Bayer, 1960)
 Ellisella maculata (Studer, 1878)
 Ellisella marisrubri (Stiasny, 1938)
 Ellisella moniliformis (Lamarck, 1816)
 Ellisella nivea (Bayer & Grasshoff, 1995)
 Ellisella nuctenea (Grasshoff, 1999)
 Ellisella paraplexauroides Stiasny, 1936
 Ellisella plexauroides (Toeplitz, 1919)
 Ellisella quadrilineata (Simpson, 1910)
 Ellisella rigida (Toeplitz, 1910)
 Ellisella rosea (Bayer & Grasshoff, 1995)
 Ellisella rossafila (Grasshoff, 1999)
 Ellisella rubra (Wright & Studer, 1889)
 Ellisella schmitti (Bayer, 1961)
 Ellisella thomsoni (Simpson, 1910)
 Ellisella vaughani Stiasny, 1940
 Ellisella vermeuleni (Stiasny, 1936)

References

External links
 

Ellisellidae
Octocorallia genera
Taxa named by John Edward Gray